Óscar Rodríguez Garaicoechea (born 6 May 1995 in Burlada) is a Spanish cyclist, who currently rides for UCI WorldTeam . In August 2018, he was named in the startlist for the Vuelta a España, winning stage 13. In October 2020, he was named in the startlist for the 2020 Giro d'Italia.

Major results

2018
 1st Stage 13 Vuelta a España
 1st  Mountains classification Tour of the Alps
2019
 2nd Overall Vuelta a Burgos
 7th Tour du Finistère
 8th Mont Ventoux Dénivelé Challenge
 9th Overall Vuelta a Murcia
 10th Overall Route d'Occitanie
1st  Mountains classification
2020
 5th Time trial, National Road Championships
 9th Overall Volta a la Comunitat Valenciana
2021
 2nd Mont Ventoux Dénivelé Challenge
 3rd Overall Route d'Occitanie
 6th Prueba Villafranca - Ordiziako Klasika
 7th Vuelta a Castilla y León
 10th Overall Vuelta a Andalucía
2022
 2nd Overall Tour de Hongrie

Grand Tour general classification results timeline

References

External links

1995 births
Living people
Spanish male cyclists
Spanish Vuelta a España stage winners
Cyclists from Navarre
People from Cuenca de Pamplona